National Takaful Company may refer to:
 Abu Dhabi National Takaful Company
 National Takaful Company (Watania)